Monica Pauline "Nikki" Santos Gil-Albert (born August 23, 1987) is a Filipino singer, actress, host, model, and video jockey. She is known for being part of the afternoon remake of Carlo J. Caparas' Pieta (2008–2009) and, in 2009, for portraying Princess Punzalan in the afternoon drama Nagsimula sa Puso (2009–2010). She is also well known for her lead portrayal as Jennifer "Jenny" La Peña in the 2012 remake of the 1990 radio serial of Salvador Royales' Mundo Man ay Magunaw, originally played by Jennifer Sevilla in the film version produced by SEIKO Films.

Biography
Monica Pauline Gil (aka Nikki Gil) was born in Manila to Dino and Julie Gil. She is of Filipino, Spanish and German descent. Born to a father who plays the piano and a mom who sang in a church choir, Nikki showed early signs of musical talent. At the age of four years, Nikki was already singing and doing voiceovers for commercials. She graduated from Shekinah Christian Training Center in March 2005 as valedictorian. In 2009, she graduated from Ateneo de Manila University, majoring in English literature.

Career

Music
Gil first rose to prominence when she was 17 years old after appearing in a 2005 Coca-Cola commercial. After that, she went on to release her first self-titled album, Nikki Gil, that same year under EMI Philippines with "Sakayan ng Jeep" as the carrier single. In 2006, it was repackaged and rereleased with and additional song, "Glowing Inside". In July 2006, EMI Philippines and Walt Disney Records hired Nikki along with other Asian artists (Vince Chong of Malaysia and Alicia Pan of Singapore) to sing and to star in the music video of "High School Musical", a Disney Channel production.  Nikki also sang "Breaking Free" and "Gotta Go My Own Way" in the production's album.

In 2008, Gil released her second music album, Hear My Heart, with "Hear My Heart" as the carrier single. She co-wrote the song with her younger sister, Dani. During the same year, Disney hired her to sing and star in the music video of the pop version of "It's a Small World After All". In addition, she was asked to sing the Tagalog version of the song at the grand opening of "It's a Small World" in Hong Kong Disneyland.

In 2010, Gil released her third music album, Somebody to Love, with "Somebody to Love" as the carrier single, a song written by her younger sister, Dani. Gil played the character of Elle Woods in the Manila production of the musical Legally Blonde which is based on the 2001 Metro-Goldwyn-Mayer motion picture Legally Blonde and the novel by Amanda Brown.

In 2014, Nikki moved to her new recording company, Universal Records.

Acting career and TV hosting
In 2005, Gil was given a VJ stint for ABS-CBN's music channel subsidiary, MYX until she left MYX in January 2016. She was also picked to host the now-defunct talk show MRS on ABS-CBN and morning show Breakfast on Studio 23. She later would join the cast of the weekly variety show ASAP Mania. In 2006, she was joined by Toni Gonzaga, Bianca Gonzalez and Sam Milby as a host for the first season of Pinoy Dream Academy, a singing reality show from Endemol. In 2007, she became part of an anime-inspired fantasy series "Rounin" and as an extended cast for the drama series "Pangarap na Bituin". In 2008, she was again chosen to be the host for the season 2 of Pinoy Dream Academy with Toni Gonzaga and Billy Crawford. In 2009, she appeared in "Pieta", an afternoon teleserye with Ryan Agoncillo, and also appeared in the teleserye "Florinda" with Maricel Soriano. Nikki Gil is one of the mainstay on ABS-CBN with ASAP XV. In 2010, she started hosting E-Live along with Luis Manzano and Ogie Diaz. She also did a fair share of hosting occasionally on Showtime replacing Anne Curtis.

In 2007, Gil did her first movie appearance by doing a cameo role as John Lloyd Cruz's best friend for One More Chance. In 2009, she appeared along with Bea Alonzo, Sam Milby and Derek Ramsay for a Star Cinema movie entitled And I Love You So. In 2010, she was the lead actress in a romance film entitled The Red Shoes produced by Unitel Pictures with Marvin Agustin, which won the Best Picture in the 27th Bogota International Film Festival.

In 2012, Gil became part of the TV remake of the Salvador Royales film Mundo Man ay Magunaw as Jennifer la Pena.

In 2013, she played a special participation role in Apoy Sa Dagat as young Odessa, and later became a star antagonist in the remake of Maria Mercedes as Misty. The same year, Nikki Gil won as Best Single Performance By An Actress for her role in "MMK" in the recent 2013 PMPC Star Awards For TV.

In 2014, she was a member of the cast of Hawak-Kamay, playing Meann.

She is expected to return to showbiz through a musical play from Repertory Philippines entitled 'Carousel'.

Personal life
She has a sister, Dani Gil, who also sings and plays the piano. Dani helped Nikki compose her songs, too. Nikki first performed in front of an audience in church as a worship leader before entering the entertainment business.

In 2008, Gil began dating Billy Crawford, and their relationship ended in 2013. According to Gil, the breakup was caused by Crawford's infidelity while she chose to remain celibate until marriage: "The scary thing, knowing what I know now, is I would have said yes to his insincere offers of marriage!" she said. "I was made to believe I was making up these things in my head—I thought we were just plateau-ing." Gil married BJ Albert (nephew of singer-actress Joey Albert) on November 21, 2015. In November 2017, Gil gave birth to her first child, a boy. She is now retired from showbiz to focus on her family life.

Theater
 2007: Seussical the Musical - The Cat
 2010: Legally Blonde: The Musical - Elle Woods
 2011: Sweet Charity - Charity Hope Valentine
 2013: They're Playing Our Song - Sonia Walsk
 2014: The Last 5 Years - Cathy Hyatt

Filmography

Movies

Television

Discography

Albums

Singles

Other appearances

Awards and nominations

References

External links
 

1987 births
Living people
Ateneo de Manila University alumni
21st-century Filipino women singers
Filipino television actresses
Filipino television personalities
Filipino people of German descent
Filipino people of Spanish descent
21st-century Filipino actresses
VJs (media personalities)
Filipino musical theatre actresses
PolyEast Records artists
Universal Records (Philippines) artists